Dining rights, in the United Kingdom, are the right to use the dining facilities offered to the members (and possibly their guests, when accompanied by a member) of certain organisations such as universities, clubs, colleges and bodies such as the House of Lords, and the Hawks' Club.

They are typically offered to ex-members of such institutions, alumni, or individuals who are in some way involved with furthering its aims, often in the spirit of honoris causa. Such rights can be highly sought after.

As dining is considered a highly social process, dining rights permit diners to engage with like-minded colleagues, members and their guests in a milieu that is less formal (but may still contain certain formalities) than that of the academic meeting, colloquium or seminar.

Such rights do not usually permit the holder to take part in the management or the functions of the institution that has offered them.

Such rights do not (usually) exempt the holder from any charges for using them, though they are extended to the holder on the same basis as the usual holders of such rights. However, restrictions are typically placed upon their frequency of use.

Holders are usually held responsible for both the bills incurred by themselves and their guests, and the behaviour of their guests during the exercise of such rights.

Typically alumni of a college or university may be offered such rights, but only on payment of a fee, and after holding an appropriate academic degree, or after a number of years since graduation.

Academic meals